Harmon Schmelzenbach is the founder of Africa Nazarene University (ANU) in Kenya, East Africa.  As a Career Assignment Missionary to the Church of the Nazarene, Schmelzenbach continued the family missionary work that started with his grandfather Harmon F. Schmelzenbach.  Harmon F. began the missionary work of the Nazarene Church in Africa in 1910.

Schmelzenbach was first appointed to Africa in 1960, and laid the groundwork for the establishment of the Nazarene Church in many countries across East Africa.  This effort culminated with the establishment of ANU in 1987 on land that he chose and arranged for purchase.  The purpose of founding ANU was an effort to train local pastors and church leaders for the ever-increasing reach of the Nazarene Church in Africa.

Schmelzenbach is third in a line of four generations of missionaries of the Nazarene church. His son, Harmon R. Schmelzenbach works in the South Pacific area as the Field Strategy Coordinator for the Melanesian and South Pacific Fields for the Church of the Nazarene.

References

External links
https://web.archive.org/web/20050914021714/http://www.trentonnaz.org/archives/harmon.html

Church of the Nazarene missionaries
Living people
Year of birth missing (living people)
Africa Nazarene University
Methodist missionaries in Kenya
American Methodist missionaries